Louis Faury (21 July 1874 – 14 January 1947) was a French military commander. In the 1920s he acted as a chief of General Staff Academy in Poland. Well known to his Polish students under nickname Papa Faury. He was made General Officer commanding the 3rd Division in 1936. From 23 August 1939 until 17 September 1939, he led the French military mission in Poland (till Soviet invasion of Poland).

He retired from the French Army later on in 1939.

Recommended literature 

 Louis Faury La Pologne Terrassée in: Revue Historique de l’Armée, IX nr 1 (1953), Paris 1953, p. 132–136.

See also
Western Betrayal for more info on the Saar Offensive.

French generals
Faury,Louis
Faury,Louis